The Anton Bruckner Private University (in German Anton Bruckner Privatuniversität, common short form is Bruckner University) is one of five Austrian Universities for Music, Drama and Dance, and one of four universities in Linz, the European Capital of Culture 2009. 850 students from all parts of the 
world study here. They are taught by 200 professors and teaching staff, 
who are internationally recognised artists, academics and teachers. More than 30% of the students and instructors come from abroad. The university was granted accredited private university status in 2004, as part of the Austrian Private Universities Conference, (its name from 1932 to 2004 was Bruckner Conservatory Linz, but the roots of the institution go back to 1823 or even to 1799). 

The cultural landscape of Upper Austria sets an example in music 
education all over Europe. The Upper Austrian Provincial Government 
gives particular support to artistic education, which is why – compared 
with similar institutions – tuition fees here are extremely moderate.

The university is named after the Austrian composer Anton Bruckner (1824-1896).

The ABPU is a university for music, drama and dance. The artistic work 
of the university is focussed on performing, pedagogy and research in 
each of these fields, with an equal emphasis on artistic communication, 
development and outreach.

History 
Even though the Anton Bruckner Private University has only been 
known under this name for a short time, musical education in Linz has a 
tradition stretching back more than 200 years. As early as 1799 the city
musical director Franz Xaver Glöggl, a close friend of Michael Haydn, 
Mozart and Beethoven, founded the first music school in Linz. Then in 
1823 the newly founded Linz Musical Society set up a singing school – 
the real precursor of the Anton Bruckner Private University.

The attempt to persuade Anton Bruckner to become director 
of the Music School in 1863 was unsuccessful. But another important name
– the Bruckner biographer and former secretary to Franz Liszt, August Göllerich,
- was in charge of the newly strengthened institute from 1896 to 1923. 
And in 1923 the name of Bruckner was finally established with the 
upgrading of the Music School to the Bruckner Conservatory Linz – now 
renamed the Anton Bruckner Private University.

The original main function of the forerunner institute, which was
to raise the quality of musical life in Linz by improving the training 
of amateur musicians, was taken over by the Linz Music School in 1950. 
From that time on the Bruckner Conservatory established itself 
progressively as a training ground for professional musicians. This 
development was carried through by the directors Carl Steiner (1945-1958), Wilhelm Jerger (1958-1973), Gerhard Dallinger (1973-1990), Hans Maria Kneihs (1990-1995) und Reinhart von Gutzeit (from 1995 to 2006), Univ. Prof. Anton Voigt (acting rector from 2006 to 2007), and Dr. Marianne Betz (2007-2012). In autumn 2012 the rectorship of the university was taken over by Ursula Brandstätter.
From the 1990s on, the Bruckner Conservatory developed from a higher 
music school into one of the most active cultural centres in Linz. The 
educational spectrum of the former Bruckner Conservatory was likewise 
continuously expanded and became the educational basis when private 
university status was attained in 2004. The Anton Bruckner Private 
University now offers twenty two separate branches of study and three 
university courses in the fields of classical music, jazz, drama and 
contemporary dance. Students may study for the degrees Bachelor of Arts 
or Master of Arts, which are on a par with those of other European 
universities and Arts Academies.

Computer music studio 
The Computer Music Studio offers lectures and courses in the field of 
music and media technology, media composition and computer music, and 
the range of subjects it offers is closely integrated with those of the 
Institute DKM – Composition, Conducting and the Theory of Music – and 
JIM, the Institute for Jazz and improvised Music.

The Computer Music Studio (CMS) is not only concerned with the teaching 
of media compositions and creating new works in the field of computer 
music. It is above all the computer as a performance instrument for the 
interpretation of existing works and new compositions which gives our 
courses at the ABPU the considerable reputation they enjoy on the 
national scene.

History:

The Computer Music Studio was founded in 1995 
as the SAMT by DI Adelhard Roidinger and the Rector of the Bruckner 
Conservatory, Hans Maria Kneihs in the buildings of the Software Park 
Hagenberg. Since 2008 the University Studio, as it became, has been 
under the direction of Weixler, Andreas
· Ao.Univ.Prof. Mag.
At the same time an institute directive changed the name of the studio to the CMS -Computer Music Studio.

There are currently co-operations with and connections to the following institutions (among others):

Internally:

 Institute for Composition, Conducting and the Theory of Music (DKM)
 Institute for Jazz and improvised Music (JIM)
 Institute for Theatre and Drama (ACT)
 Institute for Keyboard instruments (TAS)

Regionally:

 AEC - Ars Electronic Center
 Art University of Linz
 InterfaceCulture
 JKU - Johannes Kepler University
 ElisabethInnen Hospital
 SCCH Software Park Hagenberg
 Klanglandschaften (Soundscapes), Musik der Jugend (Youth Music), Province of OÖ
 DorfTV
 Klavierhaus Merta

Nationally:

 ELAK - Institute for Composition and Electroacoustics, Vienna
 MDW - University for Music and Drama, Vienna
 Prima la Musica, Salzburg
 Bösendorfer

Internationally:

 JSEM - Japanese Society for Electro Acoustic Music
 TU Studio - Berlin
 SARC - Sonic Arts Research Center Belfast, Queens University, Northern Ireland
 UEA - University of East Anglia
 BEAST - Birmingham Electroacoustic Sound Theatre, University of Birmingham
 NOVARS - Manchester, UK
 Hope University Liverpool, UK
 Northeastern University, College of Arts, Media and Design, Boston/USA

Sonic Lab 
Sonic Lab is an intermedia computer music concert hall with a 24 audio channel surround dome and double video projection, initiated by Andreas Weixler.

Erasmus 
Since the recognition of our university status in 2004, the ABPU has 
attached great importance to internationalisation, in particular through
our participation in the European Erasmus+ programme.

In the course of setting up the new generation programme Erasmus+ the ABPU was awarded the so-called Erasmus Charter in 2014.

References

External links
 http://www.bruckneruni.at
 Austrian Accreditation Council (responsible for accrediting private universities)
 Study in Austria: A Guide

Private University
Anton Bruckner Private University
Buildings and structures in Linz
Music schools in Austria
1823 establishments in the Austrian Empire
Private universities and colleges in Austria
Educational institutions established in 1823